Group C of the 1999 Fed Cup Americas Zone Group II was one of two pools in the Americas Zone Group II of the 1999 Fed Cup. Four teams competed in a round robin competition, with the top two teams advancing to the knockout stage.

Bolivia vs. Trinidad and Tobago

Barbados vs. Panama

Bolivia vs. Barbados

Trinidad and Tobago vs. Panama

Bolivia vs. Panama

Barbados vs. Trinidad and Tobago

See also
Fed Cup structure

References

External links
 Fed Cup website

1999 Fed Cup Americas Zone